Polly Scattergood (born 18 October 1986) is an English singer and songwriter. She has been described as ethereal, dark, intense and quirky, while her musical style has been described as "early 21st century electro-dance-pop of London proper". Scattergood's debut album, self-titled, was released in spring 2009 in the United Kingdom and United States. It received mixed but generally positive reviews. Arrows was Scattergood's second studio album, it was produced by Ken Thomas and Jolyon Thomas and released in Autumn 2013. Arrows received positive reviews in the media with The Independent, Rolling Stone and Mojo each awarding it four stars.

Early life
Polly Scattergood was born on 18 October 1986 in Wivenhoe, Essex. She grew up near Colchester, the eldest of three siblings with two younger brothers. Despite misunderstanding in the press, her name Scattergood is her family name. It means "here today, gone tomorrow".

Her mother was an artist and her father an actor. Scattergood's first memory of making music was playing a toy piano when she was aged four. At the age of 12, having listened to Suzanne Vega's song "Luka", Scattergood concluded, "Music doesn't have to be strident to carry a strong message" and "That you don't have to shout. You can say things and people will listen if they want to." She has stated she would often listen to Leonard Cohen as a teenager.

At the age of 16, she moved to London to attend the BRIT School, a performing arts academy.

Career
After graduation she caught the attention of music industry executive Neil Ferris who took on her management. Ferris then introduced Scattergood to Daniel Miller head of Mute Records. He led her to the producer of her debut album Simon Fisher Turner.

Scattergood describes herself as a storyteller. "I write about emotions and moments, not all are biographical." Scattergood's debut single entitled "Glory Hallelujah" was released in 2005 on Ark Records and produced by Greg Walsh. Her September 2007 single "Nitrogen Pink"  was released on Mute Records. The single "I Hate the Way" which was written on a toy keyboard was released on 22 September 2008 on both limited edition 10 inch vinyl and iTunes. The song has been described as "documenting her emotional instability and penchant for going to bed with unsuitable men".

On 10 November 2008, Scattergood was a guest on the Rob da Bank show where three of her songs were played ("I Hate the Way", "Untitled 27" and "Nitrogen Pink"). Da Bank called her "The Kate Bush of the 21st century". On 28 November, she played an acoustic set on the Janice Long show ("I Hate the Way", "Please Don't Touch" and "I've Got a Heart"). When asked about her discovery of music, she replied, "I found a guitar when I was about 12, in the coat cupboard, it had maybe 3 strings on it ... I just taught myself".

Her eponymous debut studio album, Polly Scattergood, was released 9 March 2009 in the UK. and on 19 May in the US.

"Other Too Endless" was released as a single from the album on 23 February 2009. It was named "record of the week" on the Steve Lamacq show. The download version features a remix by Vince Clarke who is a member of Erasure, ex Yazoo and ex Depeche Mode. iTunes made it 'Single of the Week' on 30 March 2009.  "Please Don't Touch" was her fourth single, released on 4 May 2009. February 2009 saw Scattergood playing several clubs and hosting her own club night. She then re-released "Nitrogen Pink" and released "Bunny Club" as singles. On 7 March 2009 Scattergood gave a live studio session on the BBC Radio 2 Dermot O'Leary show. Her cover version of "Puff, the Magic Dragon" proved to be popular with listeners, introducing many for the first time to the artist. An EP of the iTunes performance was released in August 2009 on iTunes. She supported Amanda Palmer in September 2009 at Union Chapel, Islington.

In 2011 Scattergood recorded a cover of "New York New York" for EA Games "The Wall" trailer. It premiered in Time Square, "The Wall" trailer won the Mi6 Gold award for "Best Use of Sound" and the Mi6 Silver award for "Best Game Footage Trailer. In 2012 she remixed the M83 song "Reunion".

Scattergood released her critically acclaimed second studio album, Arrows, on 22 October 2013.  The album was produced by Ken Thomas who has previously worked with Sigur Rós and M83 and consists of 10 songs, including singles,"Disco Damaged Kid"  "Wanderlust" and "Cocoon", as well as a reworked version of the previously available song, "Silver Lining". "Disco Damaged Kid" won the public vote on 6 Music's roundtable. "Wanderlust" was remixed by Charli XCX and "How to Dress Well" featured in America's Billboard magazine. The album was well received and awarded four stars by Mojo, The Independent and Rolling Stone magazine.

Scattergood supported Mute labelmates Goldfrapp at the summer series 2013 concerts at Somerset House, London on 20 July 2013. She also played two sold out nights at London's Madam Jojo's.

After Arrows was released Scattergood decided to team up with her label mate James Chapman, aka the Mercury Nominated artist Maps, to write and record a joint project, entitled "onDeadWaves".

The seeds of this creative partnership were sown in 2011 at a special Mute label night at London's Roundhouse. The event saw combinations of Mute artists pairing up to perform each other's song. Though both Chapman and Scattergood had primarily worked alone before there was a natural chemistry between the two of them on stage and they were encouraged by Mute to try a formal collaboration in the studio, which eventually led in 2016 to the release of the 'onDeadWaves' album. The album was received positively by both fans and media alike, with Chapman and Scattergood playing several sold-out shows and supporting M83 on the latter's 2016 UK Tour.

After the 'onDeadWaves' album was released Scattergood was approached by Bruce Woolley, who along with Trevor Horn, was one of the original writers of the Buggles' track, "Video Killed the Radio Star". Woolley was keen to re-record a new version of the track and wanted Scattergood to collaborate with him and the Radio Science Orchestra to supply vocals for this new recording, which was eventually to be titled "Dark Star". This new version was released by Grammaphone records in 2017.

After this Scattergood desired a change of scenery and decided to move out of her London home and relocate to the Canary Islands for the winter.

It was here that she began writing the lyrics that would eventually form the basis of her next solo album.

Now back from the desert and living in the UK, Scattergood features on 'And All Went Dark', a track from Chris Liebing's forthcoming debut album for Mute Records.

Originally scheduled for 1 May 2020, Scattergood's latest studio album, In This Moment, was released on 3 July 2020.

Discography

Studio albums

Singles

References

External links

 
 
 

1986 births
Living people
English women singer-songwriters
Mute Records artists
People educated at the BRIT School
English women in electronic music
21st-century English women singers
21st-century English singers